Hsi Tseng Tsiang (1899–1971) was a Chinese-American left-wing writer of novels, poetry, and plays. In his later years, he trained himself to be an actor in Hollywood. He was captivated with the proletarian movements and created literature works associated with the miserable life of the early Chinese Americans and the struggle of working-class in the United States. In his works, he created eccentric but radical figures, bold but self-deprecating images as instruments to serve his vision of a proletarian revolution.

Tsiang was recognized as an innovator who managed to melt the essences of literature in the eastern and western world. He was also the first left-wing writer who utilized his works to promote social changes and his political awareness from the perspective of a Chinese American. His famous novels were China Red, And China Has Hands and The Hanging on Union Square. He was also one of the first noted Chinese film actors, having moved to Hollywood in the early 1940s. One of the most famous films he acted in is Tokyo Rose.

Early life
Tsiang became a left-wing supporter when he was in China due to his personal experience and specific historical background. He was born in Jiangsu Province of China in 1899. He was orphaned at a young age and was raised by his relatives. Despite the hardship, he finished high school and won admission to Southeast University. Tsiang came of age during the Chinese Revolution of 1911, he witnessed the assassination of Liao Zhongkai (a political leader during 1920s) and attended the funeral of Sun Yat-Sen. Experiencing the failure of revolution and witnessing many people's tragic fates, he became a leftist.

Life in the U.S. 
Thanks to the provision of the National Origins Act of 1924, Tsiang could enter the U.S. as a student and continued his higher education at Stanford University in 1926. As a young man, he expressed his political concerns by means legal and illegal. He supported a number of left-wing magazines such as “Young China”, “Chinese guide in America”, and led many social activities that were against the Chinese government, showing his attitude towards those assassinations of KMT members. Soon after, He was arrested by the Los Angeles police before a rally and was attacked by a mob while giving out political brochures. For his safety, he left California and moved to Columbia University in New York City. In 1929, Tsiang finished his first volume, Poems of the Chinese Revolution, focusing on fighting communism and arguing for a broader “world-revolution.” (Cheung, 2011, p. 59).

Career 
After the first volume, Tsiang found his ways to influence the world, which are novels, poems, plays and so on. According to Cheung (2011, p. 62-67), in 1931, Tsiang self-published his first novel China Red, which was an epistolary novel and welcomed in China at that time. After a short time, Tsiang completed his new book Hanging on Union Square, while this time he moved focus to the United States, he kept asking questions from political perspective. Two years later, in his third novel And China has hands (1937), Tsiang concentrated on urban in the United States and pointed out “the diversity of its workforce and connectedness to developments in the Far East” (Cheung, 2011, p. 64). “And China Has Hands represents the remaining material traces that we have of an intellect and intelligence that was unlike any other in Chinese American history—not in its experiences or its abilities, but in its refusal to shift, change, or compromise to fit someone else’s view of what someone such as Tsiang should think or how he should be.” (Cheung, 2017). Finally, his last published work, China Marches On (1938), a play argued for fighting for justice regardless of nationalities was shown in 1939-1944.

In addition to his writing career, to make a living, he also went to Hollywood and played many characters in different films, such as The Purple Heart (1944), Tokyo Rose (1946), State Department: File 649 (1949), and Oceans Eleven (1960).

On television, he appeared in a 1964 episode of the NBC comedy-drama Kentucky Jones.  In 1966, he played town laundry owner “Ching Fa”, killed by rowdy cowboys on the TV Western Series Gunsmoke in “Gunfighter, RIP” (S12E6).

Regardless of these different artistic expressions and ways to make a living, one thing stayed the same: all of his artistic contributions reflect his political positions directly or indirectly. On July 16, 1971, he died of an illness in Hollywood.

Novels

The Hanging on Union Square 

The full name of this novel is The Hanging on Union Square: An American Epic, which was originally self-published in 1935. Though being rejected from numerous publishers before 1935, this book was later edited by Floyd Cheung and was eventually published in 2013 by Kaya Press. The novel mainly talked about a man called "Mr. Nut" , who sits in a cafeteria and listens to the problems of the people around him. Though being unemployed, he feels the situation is temporary and dreams of striking it rich.

The novel is satirical, quasi-experimental style, as described in Kaya Press website, it “explores leftist politics in Depression-era New York — an era of union busting and food lines — in an ambitious style that combines humor-laced allegory with snatches of poetry, newspaper quotations, non sequiturs, and slogans.”  Also, it's worth mentioning that each chapter of the novel comprises a single hour of the day that “Mr. Nut” sitting in the cafeteria. All in all, Kaya Press noted that the novel reflects Tsiang's writing style as the combination of “poetry, newspaper quotations, non-sequiturs and slogans, as well as elements of classical and contemporary Chinese literature.”  (Kaya Press, 2013)

And China Has Hands 
And China Has Hands, like the Hanging on Union Square, was initially rejected by publishers and originally self-published in 1937. Later in 2016, this novel was again edited by Floyd Cheung and published by Kaya Press. Besides, it's the final published novel of H.T. Tsiang. According to Kaya Press, the novel “takes place in a 1930s New York defined as much by chance encounters as by economic inequalities and corruption.”

The main character of the novel, Wan-Lee Wong, is a newly arrived, nearly penniless, Chinese immigrant everyman.  His name, in Chinese, can be ironically translated into “ten thousand fortunes.” While in reality, he experienced a difficult life as other American immigration did, went from one misadventure to another, and ended with considerably more trouble. During his life in New York, Wan-Lee “falls in love with Pearl Chang, a biracial Chinese and African American woman who wanders into his life.” (Kaya Press, 2016)  Eventually, his experiences inevitably teach him race and class consciousness, and also, reflect the situation of immigrants to the U.S. during the Great Depression seeking for home belongings.

References 

1899 births
1971 deaths
Writers from Nantong
Chinese emigrants to the United States
American writers of Chinese descent
American male actors of Chinese descent
Male actors from Jiangsu
Southeast University alumni
Stanford University alumni
Columbia University alumni
American poets
Poets from Jiangsu
20th-century American novelists
20th-century American poets
American left-wing activists